Veselovský (feminine Veselovská) is a Czech and Slovak surname. Notable people with the surname include:

 Martin Veselovský (born 1972), Czech presenter
 Peter Veselovský (born 1964), Slovak ice hockey player
 Róbert Veselovský, Slovak footballer
 Zdeněk Veselovský (1928–2006), Czech zoologist

See also
Veselovsky (disambiguation)

Czech-language surnames
Slovak-language surnames